"Power of the Paradise" is the 50th single by Japanese boy band Arashi. It was released on September 14, 2016 under their record label J Storm. "Power of the Paradise" was used as the theme song for NTV's news coverage of the 2016 Summer Olympics, which featured member Sho Sakurai as the main newscaster. The single sold over 420,000 copies in its first week and topped the weekly Oricon Singles Chart. The single was certified Double Platinum by the Recording Industry Association of Japan (RIAJ). "Power of the Paradise" was the 10th best-selling single of the year in Japan.

Single information
"Power of the Paradise" was released in two editions: a regular edition and a limited edition. The regular edition contains the B-side "Hana", the instrumentals for the two tracks, and a secret talk in the "Hana" instrumental. The limited edition contains a DVD with a music video and making-of for "Power of the Paradise" and a 20-page lyrics booklet. The album jacket covers for the two versions are different.

"Power of the Paradise" was used as the theme song for NTV's news coverage of the 2016 Summer Olympics on NTV, which featured member Sho Sakurai as the main newscaster. This is the sixth time the group has provided the theme song for NTV's news coverage of the Summer and Winter Olympic Games.

Track listing

Chart performance
On the week of September 17, 2016, "Power of the Paradise" debuted at number 69 on the Japan Billboard Hot 100 and rose to number one on October 1, 2016. The single debuted at number one on the Oricon daily singles chart selling 225,928 copies upon its release and selling 422,418 copies by the end of the week, topping the Oricon weekly singles chart and Billboard Japan's top single sales chart. In September 2016, the single was certified double platinum by RIAJ for shipments of 500,000 units.

Charts and certifications

Weekly charts

Year-end charts

Certifications

Release history

References

External links
Power of the Paradise product information
Hard Copy Sales Certifications (RIAJ)

2016 singles
2016 songs
Arashi songs